Amirabad-e Vosta Key Mohammad Khan (also Romanized as Amīrābād-e Vosţā Key Moḩammad Khān; also known as Amīrābād-e Mīānī, Amīrābād-e Vosţā, Amīrābād-e Vosţá, and Amīrābād Vostā) is a village in Dasht-e Rum Rural District, in the Central District of Boyer-Ahmad County, Kohgiluyeh and Boyer-Ahmad Province, Iran. At the 2006 census, its population was 278, in 55 families.

References 

Populated places in Boyer-Ahmad County